Abel Gance (25 October 188910 November 1981) was a French film director and producer, writer and actor. A pioneer in the theory and practice of montage, he is best known for three major silent films: J'accuse (1919), La Roue (1923), and the monumental Napoléon (1927).

Filmography

Films

Other film work

References
 

Gance, Abel
Gance, Abel